Highs in the Mid-Sixties, Volume 10 (subtitled Wisconsin) is a compilation album in the Highs in the Mid-Sixties series, featuring recordings that were released in Wisconsin.  A later volume in the series, Highs in the Mid-Sixties, Volume 15 also features bands from this state.

Release data
This album was released in 1984 as an LP by AIP Records (as #AIP-10017).

Notes on the tracks
The Shag – also known as the Shags – are one of the best-known Milwaukee garage rock bands and are pictured on the album cover.  This track – one of the first anti-drug rock songs ever recorded, in 1965, and also one of the best – has been reissued several times (for example, as a bonus track on the Pebbles, Volume 5 CD).

Track listing

Side 1

 The Shag: "Stop and Listen" (Ray McCall) — rel. 1967
 The Wanderer's Best: "The Boat that I Row" (Neil Diamond)
 The Young Savages: "The Invaders are Coming" (Lenny LaCour)
 The Faros: "I'm Cryin'" (Eric Burdon/Alan Price)
 Lord Beverley Moss & the Moss Men: "Please Please What's the Matter" (Beverley Moss)
 The Noblemen: "Dirty Robber" (Brand Schank) — rel. 1960
 The Hinge: "Come on Up" (Felix Cavaliere)

Side 2
 Jack & the Beanstalks: "Don't Bug Me" (Jack Tate)
 Jack & the Beanstalks: "So Many Times" (Jack Tate)
 The Trodden Path: "Don't Follow Me" (Mike Frommer)
 Joey Gee & the Come-Ons: "She's Mean" (Joe Giannunzio)
 The Deverons: "On the Road Again" (Bob Dylan)
 The Love Society: "You Know How I Feel" (Deliger/Steffen)
 Rehabilitation Cruise: "I Don't Care What They Say" (L. Owen)

Pebbles (series) albums
1984 compilation albums
Music of Wisconsin